1927 in sports describes the year's events in world sport.

American football
 NFL championship – New York Giants (11–1–1)
 Rose Bowl (1926 season):
 The Stanford Indians tie 7–7 with the Alabama Crimson Tide to split the national championship
 College football national championship – Illinois Fighting Illini

Association football
Colombia
 America de Cali was founded on February 13.
England
 The Football League – Newcastle United 56 points, Huddersfield Town 51, Sunderland 49, Bolton Wanderers 48, Burnley 47, West Ham United 46
 FA Cup final – Cardiff City 1–0 Arsenal at Empire Stadium, Wembley, London
 Cardiff City's FA Cup victory remains the only time the competition has been won by a club outside England.
Germany
 National Championship – 1. FC Nürnberg 2–0 Hertha BSC at Berlin.  It is the first match to be broadcast in full on German radio.
Italy
 AS Roma is founded by Italo Foschi, who initiates the merger of three older Italian Football Championship clubs from the city of Rome: Roman FC, SS Alba-Audace and Fortitudo-Pro Roma SGS.
Mexico
 Formation of the Mexican Football Federation (Federación Mexicana de Fútbol Asociación or FMF). It is also known as Femexfut.
Ukraine
 FC Dynamo Kyiv founded in former part of Soviet Union

Australian rules football
VFL Premiership
 Collingwood wins the 31st VFL Premiership, beating  2.13 (25) to 1.7 (13) in the 1927 VFL Grand Final
 The low scores, caused by a torrential fall of rain on the day before and during the match, set many records:
 The lowest winning score since 1901 when Collingwood beat  3.6 (24) to 2.7 (19)
 Richmond's score is the equal fourth lowest since 1915 and their second lowest score ever, behind 0.8 (8) against St. Kilda in 1961.
 The aggregate score of 3.20 (38) is the lowest since 1900
 It is the only time since 1908 a team has won scoring only two goals
Brownlow Medal
 The annual Brownlow Medal is awarded to Syd Coventry (Collingwood)

Bandy
Sweden
 Championship final – IK Göta 5-1 Västerås SK

Baseball
World Series
 5–8 October — New York Yankees (AL) defeats Pittsburgh Pirates (NL) to win the 1927 World Series by 4 games to 0 
Major League Baseball
 Babe Ruth hits 60 home runs, setting a major league record
Negro leagues
 For the second straight year, the Chicago American Giants (NNL) defeats the Bacharach Giants of Atlantic City, New Jersey (ECL), 5 games to 3, in the Negro World Series

Basketball
Events
January 7 –  American exhibition basketball team Harlem Globetrotters, founded by Abe Saperstein in 1926, played their first road game in Hinckley, Illinois
ABL Championship
Brooklyn Celtics win three games to none over the Cleveland Rosenblums
Greece
A first game for professional league of Greece, Panhellenic Basketball League, as predecessor for Greek Basket League held. G.S. Iraklis B.C.

Boxing
Events
 In one of the most famous fights in boxing history, Gene Tunney successfully defends his World Heavyweight Championship in a return bout with Jack Dempsey at Soldier Field, Chicago.  Tunney wins in 10 rounds but the fight is remembered as The Battle Of The Long Count after Tunney was knocked down for 13 seconds in the 7th round, the count being delayed because Dempsey did not retire to a neutral corner.
Lineal world champions
 World Heavyweight Championship – Gene Tunney
 World Light Heavyweight Championship – Jack Delaney → vacant → Tommy Loughran
 World Middleweight Championship – Mickey Walker
 World Welterweight Championship – Pete Latzo → Joe Dundee
 World Lightweight Championship – Sammy Mandell
 World Featherweight Championship – vacant
 World Bantamweight Championship – Charley Phil Rosenberg → vacant
 World Flyweight Championship – vacant

Canadian football
Grey Cup
 15th Grey Cup – Toronto Balmy Beach 9–6 Hamilton Tigers

Cricket
Events
 New Zealand tours England with a team containing many players who will later play Test cricket for New Zealand.  However, this tour does not include any Test matches and the 1927 English cricket season is the last, apart from the Second World War years and the cancelled South African tour of 1970, in which there has been no Test cricket in England.
England
 County Championship – Lancashire
 Minor Counties Championship – Staffordshire
 Most runs – Wally Hammond 2969 @ 69.04 (HS 197)
 Most wickets – Charlie Parker 193 @ 19.94 (BB 9–46)
 Wisden Cricketers of the Year – Roger Blunt, Charlie Hallows, Wally Hammond, Douglas Jardine, Vallance Jupp
Australia
 Sheffield Shield – South Australia
 Most runs – Bill Ponsford 1229 @ 122.90 (HS 352)
 Most wickets – Norman Williams 35 @ 32.02 (BB 6–88)
India
 Bombay Quadrangular – Hindus
New Zealand
 Plunket Shield – Auckland
South Africa
 Currie Cup – Western Province
West Indies
 Inter-Colonial Tournament – Barbados

Cycling
Tour de France
 Nicolas Frantz (Luxembourg) wins the 21st Tour de France

Figure skating
World Figure Skating Championships
 World Women's Champion – Sonja Henie (Norway)
 World Men's Champion – Willi Böckel (Austria)
 World Pairs Champions – Herma Szabo and Ludwig Wrede (Austria)

Golf
Major tournaments
 British Open – Bobby Jones
 US Open – Tommy Armour
 USPGA Championship – Walter Hagen
Ryder Cup
Other tournaments
 British Amateur – William Tweddell
 US Amateur – Bobby Jones

Horse racing
Events
 The inaugural Champion Hurdle is run as part of the Cheltenham Festival.
England
 Champion Hurdle – Blaris
 Cheltenham Gold Cup – Thrown In
 Grand National – Sprig
 1,000 Guineas Stakes – Cresta Run
 2,000 Guineas Stakes – Adam's Apple
 The Derby – Call Boy
 The Oaks – Beam
 St. Leger Stakes – Book Law
Australia
 Melbourne Cup – Trivalve
Canada
 King's Plate – Troutlet
France
 Prix de l'Arc de Triomphe – Mon Talisman
Ireland
 Irish Grand National – Jerpoint 
 Irish Derby Stakes – Knight of the Grail
USA
 Kentucky Derby – Whiskery
 Preakness Stakes – Bostonian
 Belmont Stakes – Chance Shot

Ice hockey
Stanley Cup
 4–13 April — Ottawa Senators defeats Boston Bruins in the 1927 Stanley Cup Finals by 2 games to 0
Events
 Memorial Cup – Owen Sound Greys defeats Port Arthur West End Juniors
 Allan Cup – University of Toronto Grads defeats Fort William Thundering Herd at Vancouver, British Columbia
 14 February – Conn Smythe purchases the Toronto St. Patricks of the NHL and changes the name to the Toronto Maple Leafs.

Motorsport

Multi-sport events
Far Eastern Championship Games
 8th Far Eastern Championship Games is held at Shanghai, Republic of China

Nordic skiing
FIS Nordic World Ski Championships
 3rd FIS Nordic World Ski Championships 1927 are held at Cortina d'Ampezzo, Italy

Rowing
The Boat Race
 2 April — Cambridge wins the 79th Oxford and Cambridge Boat Race

Rugby league
England
 Championship – Swinton
 Challenge Cup final – Oldham 26–7 Swinton at Central Park, Wigan 
 Lancashire League Championship – St Helens Recs
 Yorkshire League Championship – Hull
 Lancashire County Cup – St. Helens 10–2 St Helens Recs 
 Yorkshire County Cup – Huddersfield 10–3 Wakefield Trinity
Australia
 NSW Premiership – South Sydney 20–11 St George (grand final)

Rugby union
Five Nations Championship
 40th Five Nations Championship series is shared by Ireland and Scotland

Snooker
World Championship
 Inaugural World Snooker Championship is won by Joe Davis who defeats Tom Dennis 20–11

Speed skating
Speed Skating World Championships
 Men's All-round Champion – Bernt Evensen (Norway)

Tennis
Australia
 Australian Men's Singles Championship – Gerald Patterson (Australia) defeats John Hawkes (Australia) 3–6 6–4 3–6 18–16 6–3
 Australian Women's Singles Championship – Esna Boyd Robertson (Australia) defeats Sylvia Lance Harper (Australia) 5–7 6–1 6–2
England
 Wimbledon Men's Singles Championship – Henri Cochet (France) defeats Jean Borotra (France) 4–6 4–6 6–3 6–4 7–5
 Wimbledon Women's Singles Championship – Helen Wills Moody (USA) defeats Lilí de Álvarez (Spain) 6–2 6–4
France
 French Men's Singles Championship – René Lacoste (France) defeats Bill Tilden (USA) 6–4 4–6 5–7 6–3 11–9
 French Women's Singles Championship – Kea Bouman (Netherlands) defeats Irene Bowder Peacock (South Africa) 6–2 6–4 
USA
 American Men's Singles Championship – René Lacoste (France) defeats Bill Tilden (USA) 11–9 6–3 11–9
 American Women's Singles Championship – Helen Wills Moody (USA) defeats Betty Nuthall Shoemaker (Great Britain) 6–1 6–4
Davis Cup
 1927 International Lawn Tennis Challenge –  3–2  at Germantown Cricket Club (grass) Philadelphia, United States

References

 
Sports by year